Chamber Orchestra of New York is a professional orchestra founded by Italian composer and conductor Salvatore Di Vittorio. It was established on March 27, 2006, on the 250th anniversary of the birth of Wolfgang Amadeus Mozart, with its debut concert on October 11, 2007 at Carnegie Hall's Zankel Hall.

About the Orchestra
The Orchestra was modeled after other European-style young professional orchestras. It is one of the first auditioned orchestras in the history of New York to feature leading young musicians. Its musicians are graduates of the Juilliard School, Manhattan School of Music and Mannes College of Music, and other leading music schools in the NY Tri-State area. Violinist Kelly Hall-Tompkins is the concertmaster.

Mission
"Chamber Orchestra of New York is the city’s premier young professionals orchestra. Founded to advance the careers of extraordinary artists, the orchestra presents works that bridge the classical and modern traditions. Internationally recognized for its championing of the Italian repertoire, the orchestra aims to cultivate a wider audience for the future of classical music."

The Orchestra and Ottorino Respighi
In 2008, Ottorino Respighi’s great nieces Elsa and Gloria Pizzoli, and archive curator/cataloger Potito Pedarra, entrusted Music Director and Composer Salvatore Di Vittorio with the task of editing, orchestrating, and completing several of Respighi’s early orchestral works – such as the first Violin Concerto (in A) – in their first printed, published editions (now) distributed by Casa Ricordi in Milan. The orchestra continues to premiere ongoing new editions by Di Vittorio of Respighi's music in premieres as well as recordings on Naxos Records.

The Respighi Prize Music Competition
The orchestra established The Respighi Prize/ Il Premio Respighi Music Competition, for young composers, conductors and soloists, in 2010 in collaboration with Comune di Bologna, Italy - Respighi's birthplace.

New York Conducting Workshop
The orchestra maintains a conducting workshop each June at [Adelphi University Performing Arts Center], which offer conductors of all ages and countries the opportunity to reflect, discuss, and refine their podium experiences with veteran mentor conductors. All participants automatically become candidates of The Respighi Prize, and the winner and finalists are offered an opportunity to share the podium in selected concerts.

Advisory board
The orchestra’s Advisory Board developed to include esteemed artists such as film composer Ennio Morricone, conductor Alan Gilbert, and soloists Lynn Harrell, Cho-Liang Lin and Nadja Salerno-Sonnenberg. Honorary Board members include Respighi family descendants Elsa and Gloria Pizzoli, Respighi archive curator/cataloger Potito Pedarra and musicologist Luigi Verdi.

Venues and Productions
The Orchestra currently performs its Masterworks Series at Carnegie Hall, together with its regular June performance at the [Adelphi University Performing Arts Center]. It also returns with regularity for concerts at The Morgan Library & Museum. Over recent seasons, the orchestra has been featured at fashion shows by Moncler, Tory Burch, and Dolce & Gabbana at Lincoln Center for the Performing Arts.

Discography
Naxos Records:8.572332. RESPIGHI - Aria, Violin Concerto in A Major (violinist Laura Marzadori), Suite for strings, Rossiniana
Naxos Records:8.572333. DI VITTORIO - Overtura Respighiana, Sinfonia Nos. 1 & 2, Ave Maria for female choir, Sonata for clarinet (clarinetist Benjamin Baron)
Naxos Records:8.573168. RESPIGHI - The Birds, Trittico Botticelliano, Serenata, Suite in G for organ and strings (organist, Kyler Brown)
Naxos Records:8.573530. VAUGHAN WILLIAMS - The Lark Ascending, The Solent, Fantasia for Piano, Six Short Pieces for piano

Affiliations
League of American Orchestras
Edizioni Panastudio
Casa Ricordi

References

External links
 Chamber Orchestra of New York
 Official website of Salvatore Di Vittorio
 Official website of Kelly Hall-Tompkins
 Official website of Ottorino Respighi 
 Gruppo Editoriale Panastudio 
 Naxos Records
 Casa Ricordi

Musical groups established in 2006
Orchestras based in New York City
Chamber orchestras